Rosh HaNikra or Hanikra ( "Head of the Grotto"; , Ras an-Nakura) is a geologic formation on the border between Israel and Lebanon, located on the coast of the Mediterranean Sea, in the Western Galilee. It is a white chalk cliff face which opens up into spectacular grottos.

The Rosh HaNikra grottoes are cavernous tunnels formed by sea action on the soft chalk rock. The total length of the tunnels is some 200 meters. They branch off in various directions with some interconnecting segments. A tunnel was built by the British for the Haifa-Beirut railroad line, and in 1968 a second one was dug, both connecting the grottoes with each other and allowing access (currently: only exit) along the former route of the British railroad. For many years though, the only access to the grottoes was from the sea and the native swimmers and divers were the only ones capable of visiting. The 400 meters long tunnel dug in 1968 between the grottoes and slightly above sea level allowed easier access, and soon after a cable car was built to take visitors down from the top of the cliff to the tunnels. With a 60-degree gradient, this cable car is advertised as the steepest in the world.

A kibbutz, also named Rosh HaNikra, is located nearby. The Israeli city Nahariya is located about 10 km (6 miles) south of Rosh HaNikra.

Recognition of the potential offered by the unusual Rosh Hanikra grottoes led to the development of this beautiful site as a tourist attraction for Northern Israel.  The project was spearheaded by Bawer Mizna as Mayor of one of the kibbutzim as well as an Arab town.  He and his wife, Miriam, were among the original settlers of the area and of the nearby kibbutz, Matzuvah.

History

Hebrew Bible to Roman period
The Book of Joshua mentions "Misraphot Mayim" as a place south of Rosh HaNikra that was the border of the Israelite tribes of the time. In the First Book of the Maccabees, the "Ladder of Tyre" is referred to as the northern border of the territory under the governorship of Simon Maccabaeus in 144 BCE (1 Maccabees ). Josephus Flavius also describes Rosh Hanikra as the northern border of the city of Acre, Israel. (The Jewish War 2, 10, 2). The archaeological tell is today situated within the kibbutz.

In the First Book of Maccabees, a cape in this region is referred to as the "Ladder of Tyre"; the author could have meant either the cliffs at Rosh HaNikra, or one of two other capes jutting out into the sea slightly north or south of them. The site was later named an-Nawakir ("The Grottoes") by the Arabs.

WWII and after: railway and conflicts

Rosh HaNikra has served as a passage point for trade caravans and armies between Lebanon, Syria, Israel, Egypt, and Africa. In 1942, during World War II, after the Allied capture of Vichy-ruled Lebanon, the Haifa-Acre extension of the Hijaz Railway was further expanded into Lebanon for military purposes, which also entailed quarrying the tunnels at Ras el-Nakurah. This allowed for a railway connection between Haifa and the cities of Cairo to the south and Beirut to the north, the latter already being connected to Turkey and Iraq, or to Damascus and then via the Hijaz line to Amman. It was the South African contingent who blasted the tunnels.

The railway bridge at Rosh HaNikra was spared by the Haganah during the 1946 Night of the Bridges operation but, following a late-1947 British announcement that it would withdraw from Palestine months ahead of schedule, the bridge was destroyed by the 21st Battalion under the Palmach in late February 1948 to hinder Lebanese arms shipments to Arab forces opposing the UN Partition Plan. As repairs were prohibitively expensive, the tunnels were later completely sealed. The Lebanese railways have been largely dismantled while the Coastal Railway in Israel currently ends near Nahariya, several kilometers to the south.

Rosh Hanikra was the location where Israeli and Lebanese officials negotiated and concluded an armistice agreement in 1949 which ended the Lebanese-Israeli component of the 1948 War of Israeli Independence. A border passage across the Blue Line into Lebanon at the site is sometimes used by UNIFIL personnel.

Nature reserves and national park
The area around Rosh HaNikra includes a number of nature reserves:
 The Rosh HaNikra islands - 311 dunams declared in 1965
 The Rosh HaNikra reserve - 500 dunams declared in 1969, and an additional 765 dunams in 1996.
 Rosh HaNikra beach - 230 dunams, declared in 2003
The Rosh HaNikra national park also has jurisdiction of 220 dunams in the area.

Cable car

The Rosh HaNikra cable car is a cable car serving tourists wishing to visit the grottoes. The cable car is situated very close to the Lebanese border. The site is popular with tourists, and is one of the facilities available for tourists in Kibbutz Rosh HaNikra. The cable car was manufactured by Austrian manufacturer Doppelmayr Garaventa Group, and claims to be the steepest cable car in the world, ascending at a gradient of 60 degrees. Although its lower base station is located on the sea, the cable car is occasionally affected by stormy weather. The Israeli Sign Language sign for Rosh HaNikra derives from this cable car, as it emulates its motion.

See also
Geography of Israel
Tourism in Israel
Hiking in Israel

References

Gallery

External links
 Rosh HaNikra Official Site- Hebrew
 Rosh HaNikra Official Site- English
 .
 .

 Photos of Rosh haNikra

Caves of Israel
National parks of Israel
Nature reserves in Israel
Grottoes
Sea caves
Protected areas of Northern District (Israel)
Landforms of Northern District (Israel)
Rosh HaNikra cable car